Following is a list of municipal presidents of Cajeme, in the Mexican state of Sonora:

References

Cajeme